The Frydag family, also spelled Vrydach, Freytag, Freydag and various other slightly different spellings, is a German noble family known since the beginning of the 14th century that originated in Uradel in Westphalia.

The surname was first documented between 1198 and 1217 with the person of Wecelo Vriedach. At the end of the 13th century, Westphalian aristocrats, among them also members of the Frydags, moved to Prussia and Livonia to fight with and in the Teutonic Order for the spread of Christianity. By marrying in 1574 with the heiress of the Gödens Castle in East Frisia, the Frydag's gained great prestige and wealth. Since 1644 some family lines have been using the title Baron and since 1692 other lines have been using the title Count.

The Freytag family line has played an important role in German history, especially in the form of high-ranking knights of the Livonian Confederation, but also in the person of the supplier of the bomb to assassinate Hitler as part of the 20 July plot, Wessel Freytag von Loringhoven. In addition, the general Hugo von Freytag-Loringhoven is cited more frequently as a military writer on questions of the Worlar. The same applies to the lawyer Axel Baron von Freytagh-Loringhoven in the Weimar Republic.

Name Forms
The spelling of the different branches of the Freiherr family diverges:

 from Frydag
 from Freytag called Löringhoff
 Freytag by Loringhoven (also by Freytag-Loringhoven)
 Freytagh by Loringhoven (also by Freytagh-Loringhoven)

Additional name additions were:

 to Husen (near Syburg), extinguished in 1655
 to Buddenburg, extinct 1908
 to Sandfort (at Olfen-Vinnum), extinct in 1717
 to Goedens, imperial freemen 1649, imperial counts 1692, extinct 1746
 to Grevel (near Syburg), extinct in 1546
 to Drenhusen
 to Hockerde (near Syburg)

Furthermore, the following spellings were used as well: Vriedach, Fridagh, Frydag, Freydag, Frejdag.

The Baltic born members of the family lead as part of the name the former predicate "Baron", provided that no substitution was made by "Freiherr".

History

Westphalia

In 1199, the first instance of the name Wecelo Vriedach was found in a document in the library of Count Gottfried of Arnsberg. In 1217, the same person is again mentioned as a witness in a document belonging to the Otto I of Oldenburg, Bishop of Münster. In the first half of the 13th century, the family are working as Minstrels to the bishops of Münster and Bishopric of Minden, in the second half they are with the Archbishop of Cologne and in the pens of the abbeys of Essen and abbeys of Herford.

In 1326, a Goswin of Datteln called Fridag, was sealed with the Heraldric Coat of arms, consisting of Three Rings Crest. To the other first tangible carriers of this name, Johann von der Berswordt in his Westphalian family tree leads from 1624 belong to Theodericus Frydag, meles et castelanus in Recklinghausen, who witnessed in 1366 in a document of the monastery of Oelinghausen and Konrad Frydag 1316 his house and farm sold in Dortmund to the Dominicans to build a monastery. It is believed that the abbot Meinerus Frydag to Deutz, who died in 1330, was a brother of the above. Probably Hermann Frydag was a son or grandson of Konrad Frydag who stood in court of Count Engelbert II of the Mark in his feuds and as a witness often confirmed the documents issued by Count Engelbert in 1370. An Eberhard von Frydag was from 1385 to 1390 the 21st abbot of the former monastery of Cappenberg Castle. Arnold and Golfried Frydag signed the union of the Margrave nobility on the Laurentiustage 1419. In 1421 the uninterrupted genealogy of the Frydag family begins, when Eberhard Frydag acquired the estate of Loringhoven near Recklinghausen, and assumed the name of the estate as his surname. His descendants still bear the name Freytag von Loringhoven. This Eberhard also possessed estates in the Duchy of Jülich, which he received from the Palatinate Counts.

The House of Buddenburg was owned from the 14th century to 1902 by the line Frydag to Buddenburg but the name became extinct in 1908, which also had Loxten in the 17th century. House Grevel came into possession of the family in 1350, the local line went out 1546. House Wischlingen came in the second half of the 14th century two daughters in equal parts to the families of Frydag and Ovelacker; the Frydag part came over the family of Plettenberg in 1511 to that of Syberg. Godert and Arnt Frydag married the heirs Aleke and Belke von Husen and thus came into the possession of the Niederhofes and the Oberhofes in Husen in Syburg, today Castle Husen and House Husen, that remained in possession until 1655.

In 1421, Diederich Frydag van den Husen acquired the house Schörlingen and in acquired the house Löringhof south of Datteln, which until the 17th and 18th Century remained in the possession of the family, but which was later demolished in 1961. Around 1450, two brothers of the family, went to the Baltics, this seat being named for the Baltic branches (see below, German Order ). From 1550 to 1719 Sandfort Castle was owned by the family. A line sat on Hockerde, Pentling and Drenhusen (near Syburg). In 1574, the East Frisian Gödens came to the family as a marriage estate, which built a Baroque palace there, Schloss Gödens which was passed on to its present owner, Count Wedel, in 1746 (see below, Ostfriesische line). Georg Wilhelm Freiherr von Frydag from Gödens inherited the estate Daren in 1742 from his first wife Sophia Johanna von Schade and who built a new mansion there in 1752. Of all Westphalian branches flourishes until today only the line of barons of Frydag on Daren. Since 1907, the brickyard Olfry in Vechta, founded by August Freiherr von Frydag on Daren, has been family-owned.

Gallery

German Order
In 1445, Johann Frydag zu Talberg (zu meaning resident at) was one of the knights who assisted  Archbishop of Cologne in the Soest Feud. The archbishop and some of his knights, including Johann Frydag, were taken prisoner during the campaign. To gain their release, they bought their freedom with 32,000 gold florins. But this did not deter Dietrich from further battle as in the following year of 1446, along several other nobles, he sent a feudal letter (dispute) to Duke Reinold von Geldern.

The brothers Andreas Frydag and Johann Frydag from Löringhoff moved to Prussia in the middle of the 15th century to assist the Teutonic Order in its wars against the poles. Johann Frydag joined the Teutonic Order. His courage and valour combined with his intellect, earned him the post of army commander of the Livonian Order, a position he held for 37 years. In 1489, after appointing Wolter von Plettenberg, the Country Marshall in 1491, he was able to end the 200-year civil war in Terra Mariana. This resulted in a period of cultural prosperity and peace that existed until 1561. His brother Andreas became a merchant and a father. The third brother, Melchior (* 1466) is the common progenitor of the line in Prussia in the provinces of the Mark and Münster.

The existence of German-Baltic and German-Baltic branch of the family that existed for many centuries, i.e., in the original home of settled lines and the descendants of mostly younger sons, who had already emigrated to the State of the Teutonic Order and settled there, is also recorded in other noble families, the Vietinghoff, the Korff, the Wenge/Lambsdorff, the Grotthuß/Grothaus(en) or the Waldburg-Capustigall families.

East Frisian line to Gödens
With the brothers Franz and Bertold, the family divided in the middle of the 16th century into the East Frisian and Westphalian line.

Franz Frydag (1555-1606) married Almuth von Olden-Bockum, Almuth Boing and heiress of Gödens's daughter. So the family received the glorious Gödens and Uiterstewehr castles in East Frisia in 1574. He was a founder of several lines, of which one was raised soon after in baronial and Ducal status, but ceased in 1746.

Franz held the position of a court judge in Aurich, after he had received the approval for the establishment of a Court of Justice by Count Johan II of East Frisia (1590). When he died, he left behind a daughter Margaret, who was married and had four sons, of whom the oldest Oldenbockum, which was his mother's surname as his baptismal name (a usage that was frequent in northern Germany). He died during the Siege of Rees (1602). Other sons were Haro (1578-1637) and Melchior Ernst (1579-1641), who shared the lordship of the Gödens and Uiterstewehr lines and thus were heirs too two further family lines.

 Melchior Ernst (1579-1641) distinguished himself in the Dutch–Portuguese War and married Beate Sophia von Boineburg aus dem Hause, i.e. of the house of Hohnstein Castle. His great-granddaughter Hendrina was married to the East Frisian administrator of the Principality of Nassau-Siegen, Nicolaus Moritz Frese to Hinte and thus heir to the manor Uiterstewehr. This branch of the family became extinct in 1748.
 Haro Ernst (1578-1637) was chief of Gödens and Drost (district counciller or official) to Leer and was sent to the imperial court in Vienna in 1624 by the Lower Saxony county stadiums to lodge complaints, against the invasion of the Catholic League troops under Field Marshal Johann Tserclaes, Count of Tilly and his tendered war contributions. He left a total of three sons and four daughters by two women, one Katharina Freiin von Innhausen and Knyphause and another Elisabeth von Haaren, including:

 Herbert died in 1642 unmarried, as Drost to Emden.
 Johann Wilhelm married Johanna von Diepenbrock and became the founder of a line in Westphalia.
 Franz Hyko (born 9 January 1606) led as chief to Gödens the main stem. He received his father's job as Drost to Leer and in 1639, after marrying Elisabeth von Westerholt, heiress of Castle Hackfort, converted back to the Catholic religion. He was promoted on 3 February 1644 by Emperor Ferdinand II to an Imperial Baron (Freiherr). Franz Hyko had several children:
 Hedwig Orianna (1648-1694) was the wife of Dodo von Knyphausen, and known to Lütetsburg and Johanna, wife of Count Jan von Beuren.
 Haro Burchhard, (1640-1692), devoted himself with his brother Franz Heinrich (1643-1693) to the legal sciences at German, Dutch and French academies and made according to the custom at that time with his brother, the cavalier tour of Europe. On his return, he was appointed chamberlain by Emperor Leopold I. Because of his knowledge, he received the post of Reichshofrat in Vienna and died unmarried in Hamburg as an imperial representative at the Lower Saxony circle. From 1671 he had the water castle Gödens built in its preserved form today.
 Karl Philipp (1644-1698) entered the Order of Malta. After having made imperial service against the Turks in Hungary as well as some campaigns on the Mediterranean against the Barbarians, he became Grand Prior in Hungary and died in Valletta in 1698 when he was preparing a new campaign against Tunis.
 Hico Wilhelm (1645-1711) and Johann Ernst (1649-1703) chose the spiritual status and entered the Jesuit order. The former died as an excellent pulpit speaker in Mastricht, the latter as rector of the Jesuit College in Halle Brabant.
Franz Heinrich, brother of Haro (1643-1694) married Sophia Elisabeth von Aldenburg, the daughter of Count Anton von Aldenburg (House of Oldenburg) and his wife Auguste Gräfin zu Sayn-Wittgenstein. He followed the career of his older brother. He was appointed imperial chamberlain and Reichshofrat and from 1656 appointed as an ambassador to the court of the principality of the Margraviate of Brandenburg (German: Markgrafschaft Brandenburg) in Berlin. After the death of his brother, he also received his place at the Lower Saxony circle, one of the administrative groupings in the Holy Roman Empire. He and his brothers were promoted by Emperor Leopold on 2 January 1692 to the rank of Imperial Count. He had two sons and a daughter:
 Franz Wilhelm (1686-1722) entered the Royal Saxon Army. He died a lieutenant colonel in the Garde du Corps during a stay in Vienna in 1722.
 Burkard Philipp (1685-1746) also followed the diplomatic career of his father and uncle. After returning from universities and travels, he entered the circle of Imperial Chamberlains and Privy Councilors and Emperor Charles VI added. As an envoy to the Nordic courts in Stockholm and Copenhagen, he developed his diplomatic skills. He kept his position until his death in Copenhagen, where he died in 1746 at the age of 61 years. He was married to Ebela Auguste Countess Bielke the daughter of the royal Danish Major General Count Christoph Bielke (1654-1704). His wife brought good things like Lopkeld, Oberaha, Nederowe into the family. His son of the same name died shortly after birth. This extinguished the line. The heirs were the descendants of his sister Maria Juliane (1684-1727), who was married to the royal Danish general Erhard Friedrich von Wedel-Jarlsberg (1668-1740). Their son Anton Franz von Wedel (1707-1788) now inherited the glory of Göden, which is since then in the possession of the Counts of Wedel

Coat of Arms
The root coat of arms shows in blue three (2: 1) silver rings. On the helmet with blue-silver blankets is a bilateral open signposted flight.

Bearers of the family name

 Johann Freytag von Loringhoven (1483–1494), Landmaster of Livonian Order
 Franz Ico von Frydag (1606–1652), Officer and Diplomat, Member of the Fruitful Society
 Georg Wilhelm Frydag zu Gödens (1712–1782), Regierungsrat
 Christian Philipp Frydag zu Gödens (* 1714), from 1755, Drost (bailiff) of Aurich
 Christian Wilhelm Freytag von Gödens († 10 June 1804), Träger des Pour le Mérite, Oberst und Kommandeur des Infanterieregiments Nr. 10, Drost von Aurich
 Wilhelm von Freytag (1720–1798), Dragoon major near Minden in 1759, Field Marshal, Military Teacher of Ernest Augustus, King of Hanover
 Hugo von Freytag-Loringhoven (1855–1924), German general and military historian
 Mathilde Freiin von Freytag-Loringhoven (1860–1941), German painter, graphic artist, art critic, writer and animal psychologist
 Elsa von Freytag-Loringhoven (1874–1927), German Dada artist
 Axel von Freytagh-Loringhoven (1878–1942), German international lawyer and member of the Reichstag of the German National People's Party, until June 1933 then joined the Nazi Party
 Wessel von Freytag-Loringhoven (1899–1944), Baltic German member of the resistance against Adolf Hitler
 Frank Baron Freytag von Loringhoven (1910–1977), German genealogist and journalist
 Bruno von Freytag-Löringhoff (1912–1996), German philosopher, mathematician and epistemologist
 Bernd von Freytag-Loringhoven (1914–2007), Baltic German general
 Robert Freitag, né Robert Peter Freytag (1916–2010), Austrian-Swiss stage and screen actor and film director
 Waltraud Freydag (1940–2010), first wife of Prince Friedrich Wilhelm of Prussia, eldest member of the defunct German Royal House of Prussia
 Bettina von Freytag genannt Löringhoff (* 1943), German archaeologist, University of Tübingen
 Arndt Freiherr Freytag von Loringhoven (* 1956), German diplomat, NATO's new intelligence chief and former Vice President of the Federal Intelligence Service (son of Lt. General Baron Bernd Freytag von Loringhoven) 
 Tatjana Freytag von Loringhoven (* 1980), Austrian equestrian rider and 2002 FEI World Equestrian Games participant 2002

Literature
 
 Genealogical Handbook of the Nobility, Volume 61, 1975,
 Westphalian document, Westfälisches Urkunden-Buch, Bd.II, Nr. 576, Volume III, Nr. 117
 Goth. frhrl. Taschenbuch, A 1896, 1898, 1934, 1942
 Genealogical Handbook of the Nobility, A 2, 1956; A 61, 1975, Frhr. 18, 1995;
 Genealogical Handbook of the Baltic Knights, parts Kurland and Livland, Genealogisches Handbuch der Baltischen Ritterschaften, Teile Kurland und Livland, Görlitz 1929–1935; Teil Oesel, Tartu (Dorpat) 1935–1938;
 Introduction to Swedish Notability, Den introducerade svenska adelns ättartavlor, Stockholm 1926;
 Nederlands Adelsboek 1908
 
 
 Bernd Freytag von Loringhoven und François d' Alançon, In Hitler's bunker, Dans le bunker de Hitler: 23 juillet 1944 - 29 avril 1945, Verlag Éditions Perrin: Paris 2005, 
 deutsch: With Hitler in the bunker - Records from the Führer's headquarters, Mit Hitler im Bunker – Aufzeichnungen aus dem Führerhauptquartier Juli 1944 – April 1945, Berlin 2006,

References

External links
 Haro van Freitag Heer van Gödens
 Franz Heinrich von Freitag

Westphalian nobility
Baltic nobility
German noble families
Baltic-German people